Sewel may refer to:

John Sewel, Baron Sewel, member of the British House of Lords
Legislative Consent Motion (called a Sewel Motion in relation to Scotland), a procedure whereby a devolved parliament in the United Kingdom gives the central government permission to legislate on a devolved matter

See also

 Sewell (disambiguation)
 Sewall